Banksia is a genus of iconic Australian wildflowers.

Banksia may also refer to:
 Rosa banksiae, a species of rose
 Banksia, New South Wales, a suburb of Sydney, Australia.
 Banksia Environmental Foundation, organisers of the annual Banksia awards

See also
 Banksia Men, characters in the children's book Snugglepot and Cuddlepie
 Banksiadale, a locality and former town in the Peel region of Western Australia